The Awolowo v. Shagari case was a lawsuit  between Chief Obafemi Awolowo and Alhaji Shehu Shagari in which Chief Obafemi Awolowo's petition challenged the declaration of Shehu Shagari as the president elect of the 11 August 1979, presidential election.

Summary Of Judgement
This is an Election petition where the Court was called upon to interpret Section 34 A (i) (ii) of Electoral Decree No 73 of 1977. The Appellant (I.e) Awolowo contested the declaration of the first Respondent as President of the Federal Republic of Nigeria on the grounds that Section 34 A(i)(c)(ii) of the Electoral Decree had not been satisfied (i.e.) (winning one quarter of the votes in two thirds of all the states of the federation). The Election Tribunal dismissed the Appellant's claims, affirming the Election of the first Respondent. The Appellant appealed. This Court (Supreme Court) affirmed the decision of the tribunal and dismissed this appeal.
The case was decided by the Supreme Court of Nigeria on 26 September 1979, and the presiding judge was Atanda Fatai Williams, while the only dissenting judge was Kayode Eso.

References

Nigerian case law
1979 in case law
1979 in Nigeria
Supreme Court of Nigeria